The PAC-PAD Takhti 7 is a tablet-computer offered by Pakistan Aeronautical Complex developed in conjuncture with INNAVTEK, the Takhti differs from its sister product PAC PAD 1 because it has double RAM and a dual-core ARM Cortex-A8 processor, the Takhti uses Android Ice Cream Sandwich instead of Android Gingerbread used by the PAC-PAD 1. It is currently priced at PKR 12500 ($120), including warranty and multiple covers/casings for the device.

Features
Processor: 1 GHz Cortex-A8
Operating System: Android OS 4.0
Memory: 512 MB RAM
Micro SD Card: Up to 32 GB
Display: 7" inch, 800x480 resolution
Connectivity: Wi-Fi: 802.11 b/g
USB: Mini-USB 2.0
HDMI: HDMI support available
Miscellaneous:	G-sensor, 3.5mm earphone jack
Software & Games: Word, Excel, Powerpoint
Supported audio formats: MP3, WMA, AAC, WAV
Supported video formats: AVI, MKV, WMV, MOV, MP4, MPEG, MPG, FLV
Supported image formats: JPG, BMP, PNG, GIF highest support 4096 x4096
Other supported formats: PDF, TXT
Supports online games, online video streaming

See also
PAC-PAD 1
PAC-eBook 1
Pakistan Aeronautical Complex

References

Pakistan Aeronautical Complex products
Information technology in Pakistan
Tablet computers introduced in 2012
Android (operating system) devices
Tablet computers